Bernard H. Raether (June 15, 1889 – June 24, 1980) was a member of the Wisconsin State Assembly.

Biography
Raether was born on June 15, 1889 in Casco, Wisconsin. He graduated from high school in Eau Claire, Wisconsin before attending the University of Wisconsin-Eau Claire. He died on June 24, 1980.

Career
Raether was elected to the Assembly in 1954 and was defeated for re-election in 1956. Additionally, he was President of the Eau Claire County, Wisconsin Board and Chairman, Clerk and Assessor of Augusta, Wisconsin. He was a Democrat.

References

External links

People from Kewaunee County, Wisconsin
Politicians from Eau Claire, Wisconsin
County supervisors in Wisconsin
Democratic Party members of the Wisconsin State Assembly
University of Wisconsin–Eau Claire alumni
1889 births
1980 deaths
People from Augusta, Wisconsin
20th-century American politicians